Deer is a Native American given name. Notable people with the name include:

 Dick Deer Slayer, twentieth century Native American football player
 Susan Deer Cloud (born 1950), Native American writer

North American given names